The Welland Generals are Junior "B" box lacrosse team from Welland, Ontario, Canada.  The Generals play in the OLA Junior B Lacrosse League.  They were originally called the Welland Warlords.

History

Founded in 2001 by William (Billy) John House and Louis Savona, the Warlords had two strong seasons from the start.  They even made the playoffs those first two seasons.  From 2003 until 2006 have been positively dreadful though, capping it off in 2006 with a 0–20–0 record.  In a lacrosse hotbed like the Golden Horseshoe it is unfortunate to see Welland suffer through recent seasons.
In 2007 they debut new jerseys, sporting the warlord overtop of the background of the Welland river/canal. Also debuting new colours of blue and red. 2008 was a turn-around season for the Warlords as they finished the regular season with a 10–10–0 record and made their first playoff appearance in six years. At the end of the 2008 season Warlords goalie Connor Danko was named Western Conference Rookie of the Year and the Warlords coaching staff was named Western Conference Coaching Staff of the Year.

2009 was the most successful season in franchise history. The Warlords finished the regular season with a 13–6–1 record which was good for fourth in the Western Conference. In the 1st round of the playoffs the Warlords defeated the Guelph Regals 3 games to 1 in a best-of-five series. With this series the team won its first playoff game and series in franchise history. In the second round the Warlords faced the Six Nations Rebels, a team in which they finished tied with in the regular season standings. The Warlords pushed the back-to-back Founder's Cup champions to the brink only to lose in 8–7 in the 5th game to lose the series 3 games to 2. The game was surrounded by controversy as the Warlords launched a protest with the Ontario Lacrosse Association over the use of an illegal player. The decision was that the player was eligible only due to mistakes made by minor lacrosse Zone 9 and the OLA. Following this season the Warlords captain, Kevin Floris, was named the Western Conference Most Valuable Player.

In recent years, the team changed its moniker to the "Generals".

Season-by-season results
Note: GP = Games played, W = Wins, L = Losses, T = Ties, Pts = Points, GF = Goals for, GA = Goals against

External links
Welland Generals Homepage
The Bible of Lacrosse
Unofficial OLA Page
OLA Website

Ontario Lacrosse Association teams
Sport in Welland